Türk Maarif Koleji, commonly referred to as Kolej, is a selective secondary education institute in Nicosia, Northern Cyprus. Access to the school is only open to students with top score in a nationwide entrance exam. It is an English-medium school.

The school is famous with their highly successful academic programme, consecutively receiving national and international awards. The school is also very successful in sports, musical competitions and science olympiads.

The school follows the English curriculum, preparing students for the International General Certificate of Secondary Education and the GCE Advanced Level examinations. However, students are allowed to follow the Turkish curriculum from Year 10 if they choose to prepare for Yükseköğretim Kurumları Sınavı. All students receive Devlet Lise Diploması (State Lycee Diploma) following their graduation.

History
The school was founded on 27 January 1964 by Hasan Nevzat and two teachers Behzat Gürsel and Mahmut İslamoğlu all teaching members at the English School, which had remained in the Greek Cypriot controlled side after intercommunal fighting between Turkish Cypriots and Greek Cypriots in December 1963. The School was established as a private school in a rented house in the Köşklüçiftlik area and later extended to a ruined church with four classrooms. The school was primarily set up as an English-medium school modelled on the English School, preparing students for the UK GCE examinations. It was then called Kösklüçiftlik İngiliz Okulu (Kösklüçiftlik English School).

Eventually, the school moved to the Victoria Girls High School building near the Atatürk Square, and then transferred to the old Commercial Lycee next to the Haydarpasha Mosque. In 1968, it was turned over to the Turkish Education Office and its name was changed to the İngiliz Koleji (English College). Until the year of 1973 the school did not award a diploma to its graduates. Due to the changes made in the entrance to Turkish universities, the school's name was changed once again to Türk Maarif Koleji (Turkish Educational College) in 1973, and the school was authorised to award high school diplomas to its graduates. The school moved to its present location in 1974 which was previously used by an old Greek Cypriot High School, Gymnasio Neapolis in Kizilbash. After 1991 the secondary school portion (first, second, and third forms) moved to another building (as a separate school, Bayraktar Turk Maarif Koleji, leaving the high school portion (fourth, fifth and sixth forms). In academic year 2009-2010  the secondary school moved back onto the main premises at Okullar Yolu Street, which remains the current location of the school.

Head teachers
Mr. Hasan Nevzat (1964–1967) - Deceased

Mr. Selim Inan (1967–1969)

Mr. Sacit Nereli (1969 - March 1980)

Mr. Vural Aşıcıoğlu (March 1980 - Sept 1980) (Acting Headmaster)

Mr. Şinasi Tekman (Sept 1980 - March 1990) - Deceased

Mr. Recai Deren (March 1990 - June 1990)

Mr. Erdogan Şensoy (1990–1993)

Mrs. Emine Beton (1993–2001)

Mr. Fehmi Tokay (2001–2020)

Mrs. Candan Kortay (2020-current)

Athletics
Türk Maarif Koleji has a highly successful athletics programme. Even though the school does not offer any athletic scholarships, the varsity teams earn top national ranks in multiple disciplines.

2016-2017 national honours
only teamwise top three results are listed
 First place in high school girls' chess
 First place in high school mixed chess
 First place in high school boys' swimming
 First place in high school girls' table tennis
 First place in high school boys' tennis
 First place in secondary school girls' chess
 First place in secondary school mixed chess
 First place in secondary school boys' futsal
 First place in secondary school boys' table tennis
 First place in secondary school boys' tennis
 Second place in high school boys' basketball
 Second place in high school boys' judo
 Second place in high school girls' swimming
 Second place in secondary school girls' table tennis
 Second place in secondary school girls' tennis
 Third place in secondary school boys' basketball
 Third place in high school girls' cross country running
 Third place in secondary school boys' swimming
 Third place in secondary school girls' swimming

Notable alumni

 Tufan Erhürman, Prime Minister of Northern Cyprus, Member of Parliament
 Serdar Denktaş, Member of Parliament, Cabinet Minister for Finance, former Deputy Prime Minister, former Acting Prime Minister of Northern Cyprus
 Özdil Nami, Member of Parliament, Cabinet Minister for Economy and Energy, former Chief Negotiator
 Raşit Pertev, poet, author, former Chief Negotiator, former Cabinet Minister, former Secretary General of World Federation of Farmers, former Undersecretary for the Office of the President
 Mehmet Harmancı, Mayor of North Nicosia, former Cabinet Minister
 Hasan Taçoy, Member of Parliament, former Cabinet Minister
 Mustafa Djamgoz, professor of cancer biology at Imperial College London, Chairman of the College of Medicine's Science Council 
 Tahsin Ertuğruloğlu, former Member of Parliament, former Cabinet Minister
 Raif Denktaş, composer, journalist, academician, former Member of Parliament, former Political Adviser to the President 
 Neşe Yaşın, poet and author
 Suat Günsel, founder of Near East University
 Hussein Chalayan, recipient of the Order of the British Empire, fashion designer and two-times winner of the British Designer of the Year award

Sister schools
 Pertevniyal High School
 Yeşilköy 50th Year Anatolian High School

References

External links
 Turk Maarif Koleji Official Web Page
 Turk Maarif Koleji Education, Science and Culture Foundation

Schools in Northern Cyprus
Organisations based in Northern Cyprus
Educational institutions established in 1964
1964 establishments in Cyprus
Buildings and structures in North Nicosia